Dirty History is the third solo studio album by American rapper Anybody Killa. It was released on July 27, 2004 via Psychopathic Records. Production was handled by Fritz the Cat, Lavel, Mike Puwal, Esham and The R.O.C., with co-production by Violent J and ABK himself. It features guest appearances from Insane Clown Posse, Blaze Ya Dead Homie, Twiztid and Lavel.

The album peaked at No. 152 on the Billboard 200, No. 53 on the Top R&B/Hip-Hop Albums, No. 10 on the Independent Albums and No. 7 on the Heatseekers Albums in the United States.

A music video was directed for the promotional single "Hey Y'all".

Track listing

Notes
 signifies a co-producer.

Personnel
James "Anybody Killa" Lowery – main artist, rap vocals (tracks: 2-17), additional vocals (track 1), beatboxing (track 5), co-producer (tracks: 1-3, 5-17)
Joseph "Violent J" Bruce – featured artist, rap vocals (tracks: 4, 14), additional vocals (tracks: 6, 7, 13, 15), co-producer (tracks: 2-17)
Chris "Blaze Ya Dead Homie" Rouleau – featured artist, rap vocals (tracks: 6, 12)
James "Jamie Madrox" Spaniolo – featured artist, rap vocals (track 8), additional vocals (track 6)
Paul "Monoxide" Methric – featured artist, rap vocals (track 8), additional vocals (track 6)
Joseph "Shaggy 2 Dope" Utsler – featured artist, rap vocals (track 10), scratches (tracks: 3, 5, 8)
James "Lavel" Hicks – vocals (track 1), additional vocals (tracks: 6, 13, 16), programming (tracks: 1, 8, 15), engineering (tracks: 1, 10, 15), producer (tracks: 1, 8, 11, 13)
Esham Smith – additional vocals (tracks: 1, 12), scratches (track 2), programming & producer (track 12)
Ry-Ry – additional vocals (track 1)
Syn of Zug Izland – additional vocals (tracks: 3, 7)
Michelle "Sugar Slam" Rapp – additional vocals (track 11)
Sabrina – additional vocals (track 17)
Michael Puwal – keyboards (track 5), programming (tracks: 3, 5, 7, 11, 17), engineering (tracks: 3, 5, 7, 11, 12), producer (tracks: 3, 17)
Fritz "The Cat" Van Kosky – programming (tracks: 2, 4, 6, 9, 10, 13, 14, 16, 17), engineering (tracks: 2, 4, 6, 8, 9, 13, 14), producer (tracks: 2, 4, 6, 9, 10, 13-16)
Bryan "The R.O.C." Jones – producer (track 7)
Michael Scotta – illustrations, layout design
Bob Alford – photography

Charts

References

External links

2004 albums
Anybody Killa albums
Albums produced by Esham
Psychopathic Records albums
Albums produced by Mike Puwal